"Voice of Truth" is a song recorded by Casting Crowns and written by Mark Hall and Steven Curtis Chapman. It was the third single released from their 2003 debut album, Casting Crowns. "Voice of Truth" was an enormous success on Christian radio; the song reached number 1 on the three major Contemporary Christian music charts, Billboard, and 20 The Countdown Magazine.

The song uses the Biblical stories of Peter walking on the water to Jesus (Matthew 14:22-34) and David defeating Goliath (I Samuel 17).

Background and composition
"Voice of Truth" is a ballad with a length of five minutes and twenty-five seconds. It is set in common time in the key of F major, with a moderate tempo of eighty-four beats per minute and a vocal range spanning from B3-F♯5. Musically, "Voice of Truth" was played has influences from pop, ballad, and worship

Charts

Decade-end charts

Uses
"Voice of Truth" was featured in the trailer and the ending of the 2006 movie Facing the Giants. The song also was featured on the compilation album WOW Hits 2006.

When Casting Crowns was on tour with Steven Curtis Chapman, they performed this song together.

Awards 

In 2005, the song won a Dove Award for Inspirational Recorded Song of the Year at the 36th GMA Dove Awards. In 2007, the song was nominated again for a Dove Award for Worship Song of the Year at the 37th GMA Dove Awards.

Certifications

References 

2003 singles
Casting Crowns songs
Songs written by Mark Hall (musician)
Songs written by Steven Curtis Chapman
2003 songs